William Guy Collar (born 3 February 1997) is an English professional footballer who plays as a central midfielder for  club Stockport County.

Career

Brighton & Hove Albion
He made his debut for Brighton on 28 August 2018, in the EFL Cup at home against Southampton where he played the full match in a 1–0 loss against their south coast rivals. He left Brighton at the end of the 2018–19 season to join Hamilton Academical.

Hamilton Academical
He signed for Scottish club Hamilton Academical in June 2019. Collar scored the winner for Hamilton in a vital 2-1 win over Hearts in December 2019 which helped Hamilton avoid relegation from the SPFL, at the expense of Hearts.

In February 2021, Collar departed Hamilton Academical, via mutual consent.

Stockport County
On 4 February 2021, Collar joined National League side Stockport County on a contract until the end of the 2020-21 season. In May 2021 Will penned a new two-year deal with Stockport until the end of the 2022-23 season. On 15 May 2022 Collar scored the 2nd of the match and final goal of the season in a 2-0 win over FC Halifax to help Stockport secure promotion and a return to the Football League for the first time in 11 years gaining promotion as National League Champions. Will signed a new three year deal keeping him at Stockport until the end of the 2024-25 season. 

On 7 December 2022, Collar scored his first professional hat trick as Stockport beat League One Charlton Athletic 3-1 in an FA Cup 2nd round replay at Edgeley Park.

Will scored 14 goals in 43 appearances in 2022, almost averaging a goal every 3 games.

Career statistics

Honours
Stockport County
National League: 2021–22

References

1997 births
Living people
People from Horsham
English footballers
Association football midfielders
Brighton & Hove Albion F.C. players
Hamilton Academical F.C. players
Stockport County F.C. players
Scottish Professional Football League players
English Football League players